Hot Bird is a series of Eutelsat communications satellites.

Hot Bird or Hot Birds may also refer to:

 Eutelsat TV Awards, originally known as the Hot Bird TV Awards, an annual television awards, sponsored by Eutelsat.
 Mattel Hot Birds, die cast toy model airplane series from Mattel, a spin-off of Hot Wheels

See also

 Bird (disambiguation)
 Hot (disambiguation)
 Redbird (disambiguation)
 Firebird (disambiguation)
 Chicken as food